Giovanni di Ser Giovanni, (1406 – 1486) also known as Lo Scheggia, or "the Splinter" was an Italian painter who was born in San Giovanni Valdarno and was brother to the famous Masaccio.

Biography
Born in San Giovanni in Altura, now San Giovanni Valdarno, he moved with his family to Florence in 1417. Between 1420 and 1421 he came into relationship with Lorenzo Bicci, probably as an assistant in his workshop. In 1426 he was registered in Pisa as a guarantor for his brother Masaccio, and he refused his brother's inheritance in 1428, for the inconsistency. In 1429 the artist had his own workshop in Florence in the parish of Sant'Apollinare.

In 1430 he joined the Guild of Saint Luke. He joined the "Guild of the Legnaioli" as a "forzerinario", or chest maker; then in 1433 he matriculated in the Art of Doctors and Apothecaries. Between 1436 and 1440 he provided the cartoons for the inlays of the Sacristy of the Florentine Cathedral.

In these years, he manufactured luxury furniture especially for the clients in town and in the country he produced altarpieces and frescoes, a signed fragment of the latter being the Martyrdom of San Lorenzo in church of San Lorenzo in San Giovanni Valdarno. In 1449 on the occasion of the birth of Lorenzo de' Medici Lo Scheggia painted the Desco da parto with the Triumph of Fame now in the Metropolitan Museum of Art in New York. Lo Scheggia died in 1486 and was buried in the basilica of Santa Croce.

Also included in his catalog of works are: a Madonna and Child (1450), originally in the church of San Lorenzo in San Giovanni Valdarno and a tempera on a panel depicting the Choir of Angel Musicians, part of the door from the vestry of the organ Oratory of San Lorenzo. In the former Abbey of Vallumbrosan Order in Soffena is also preserved a fine Annunciation, while in the Accademia Gallery in Florence is the so-called Adimari Cassone, a panel with a party scene set in a city landscape in perspective, in which the Florence Baptistery is recognisable.

References

Sources

Literature
Alessandro Delpriori, La giovinezza dello Scheggia e una Madonna col Bambino all'alba del Rinascimento, Firenze, Frascione Arte, 2011.

External links

Art and the empire city: New York, 1825-1861, an exhibition catalog from The Metropolitan Museum of Art (fully available online as PDF), which contains material on "Scheggia" (see index)

1406 births
1486 births
People from the Province of Arezzo
15th-century Italian painters
Italian male painters
Italian Renaissance painters
Painters from Tuscany